The 1905 New York Giants season was the franchise's 23rd season, and the team won their second consecutive National League pennant. They beat the Philadelphia Athletics in the World Series.

Regular season 

This team featured three Hall of Fame players – catcher Roger Bresnahan, and pitchers Christy Mathewson and Joe McGinnity – along with Hall of Fame manager John McGraw. Mathewson won the pitching triple crown and then had one of the greatest World Series performances of all-time, with three shutouts in six days. Only six men pitched for the Giants in 1905. The offense, led by "Turkey" Mike Donlin, scored the most runs in the majors.

On June 29, Archie "Moonlight" Graham, made famous through the novel Shoeless Joe and subsequent movie Field of Dreams, made his lone major league appearance.

Season standings

Record vs. opponents

Roster

Player stats

Batting

Starters by position 
Note: Pos = Position; G = Games played; AB = At bats; H = Hits; Avg. = Batting average; HR = Home runs; RBI = Runs batted in

Other batters 
Note: G = Games played; AB = At bats; H = Hits; Avg. = Batting average; HR = Home runs; RBI = Runs batted in

Pitching

Starting pitchers 
Note: G = Games pitched; IP = Innings pitched; W = Wins; L = Losses; ERA = Earned run average; SO = Strikeouts

Relief pitchers 
Note: G = Games pitched; W = Wins; L = Losses; SV = Saves; ERA = Earned run average; SO = Strikeouts

Awards and honors

League top five finishers 
Red Ames
 #2 in NL in strikeouts (198)
 #3 in NL in wins (22)

Art Devlin
 MLB leader in stolen bases (59)

Mike Donlin
 MLB leader in runs scored (124)
 #3 in NL in batting average (.356)
 #3 in NL in slugging percentage (.495)

Christy Mathewson
 MLB leader in wins (31)
 MLB leader in ERA (1.28)
 NL leader in strikeouts (206)

Joe McGinnity
 #4 in NL in wins (21)

Sam Mertes
 #2 in NL in RBI (108)
 #4 in NL in stolen bases (52)

1905 World Series 

NL New York Giants (4) vs AL Philadelphia Athletics (1)

References

External links
1905 New York Giants season at Baseball Reference

New York Giants (NL)
San Francisco Giants seasons
New York Giants season
New York G
National League champion seasons
World Series champion seasons
1900s in Manhattan
Washington Heights, Manhattan